Ba Tays is a village in the Republic of Yemen. Follow the geography of the province of Abyan and administratively to the Directorate Khanfar. With a population of 6222 people, according to census conducted in 2004

External links
Towns and villages in the Abyan Governorate

Populated places in Abyan Governorate
Villages in Yemen